Ofloxacin, a drug
 Royal Swedish Opera, colloquially known as Operan in Sweden
 Finnish National Opera, colloquially known as Operan among Swedish-speaking Finns